Pachypsylla is a genus of psyllids. Species of the genus Pachypsylla lay eggs on the leaves of the Celtis occidentalis tree. Upon hatching, the young psyllids become encased in a gall which the young leaf parts grow in response to the infestation.

Species
The following species are recognised in the genus Pachypsylla:
Pachypsylla celtidisasterisca Riley, 1890 
Pachypsylla celtidiscucurbita Riley, 1890 
Pachypsylla celtidisgemma Riley, 1885 – hackberry bud gall maker
Pachypsylla celtidisglobula Riley, 1890
Pachypsylla celtidisinteneris Mally, 1894 
Pachypsylla celtidismamma (Riley, 1881) – hackberry nipplegall maker
Pachypsylla celtidispubescens Riley, 1890 
Pachypsylla celtidisumbilicus Riley, 1890 
Pachypsylla celtidisvesicula Riley, 1890 – hackberry blistergall psyllid
Pachypsylla cohabitans Yang & Riemann, 2001
Pachypsylla dubia Patch, 1912
Pachypsylla pallida Patch, 1912
Pachypsylla tropicala Caldwell, 1944 
Pachypsylla venusta (Osten-Sacken, 1861) – petiolegall psyllid

Gallery

References

Aphalaridae
Psylloidea genera